Georg Karg (August 2, 1888 - November 27, 1972 in Bad Homburg vor der Höhe) was a German businessman in the department store industry. After rising in the employ of the Hermann Tietz Department Stores, Karg took over the company when it was Aryanized, that is forcibly transferred to non-Jewish owners under the Nazis. After the Jewish owners were forced out, Karg was appointed managing director, running the stores under the name Hertie.

Life 
Born on August 2, 1888, in Friedeberg in der Neumark, Karg was the seventh child of ten siblings of the small cloth manufacturer and later textile retailer Karl Karg and his wife Luise. After an apprenticeship in the textile department store F. R. Knothe in the neighboring district town of Meseritz, Karg began working in 1908 as a simple textile salesman in a department store of Adolf Jandorf's Berlin department store chain. Thanks to his diligence and near-photographic memory, Jandorf promoted him to textile buyer after just one year. In 1913, Jandorf appointed him general manager of the second largest Jandorf department store on Wilmersdorfer Strasse with 600 employees.

After the sale of the Jandorf chain to the Hermann Tietz Group at the end of 1926, Karg became head of central textile purchasing at Hermann Tietz OHG. This made him "one of the best-paid department store managers in Germany" and in 1931 he could afford to turn down a lucrative offer from the Karstadt Group of 500,000 Reichsmarks in annual salary.

Nazi era 
The takeover of the Tietz stores by the non-Jewish Georg Karg is considered an example of the role of banks and private businessmen in the Aryanization of Jewish-owned business under the Nazis.

The  Jewish-owned Tietz Group was, like the Wertheims and several other department stores, targeted by the Nazis. The Nazi-organized boycotts hurt business. A promised loan of 14.5 million Reichsmarks by the semi-public Akzept- und Garantiebank at the beginning of 1933 was canceled after Hitler came to power in February 1933. Dresdner Bank, which had been nationalized in 1932, Deutsche Bank and others took advantage of the company's liquidity crisis to expel the Jewish shareholders of Hermann Tietz OHG ("Aryanization").

Jews working at the store were fired.  Creditor banks founded Hertie Kaufhaus-Beteiligungs-Gesellschaft m.b.H. (Hertie GmbH for short) shortly thereafter in July 1933. On July 29, 1933, the banking consortium forced Hugo Zwillenberg's resignation from the management, and his replacement by the non-Jewish Karg. On August 18, 1934, Georg and Martin Tietz were removed from the management and ownership of the company. The Jewish shareholders had to surrender their shares to Hertie GmbH and were paid less than 10%: 1.5 million Reichsmarks for their severely undervalued company assets with an actual value of 21.5 million Reichsmarks.

Karg introduced a new accounting system and slashed salaries. Karg later bought out the banking group's shares in Hertie GmbH in two installments, in 1936 against payment of 2.5 million Reichsmarks partly on credit and another 50 percent in June 1940; at the same time, Karg took over the Tietz Group's debts of 129 million Reichsmarks. Despite this amount of debt, Ladwig-Winters did not consider the Tietz Group to be a "bankrupt company" at that time, but rather as "economically extremely resilient".

In 1939, Josef Neckermann and Georg Karg founded the Zentrallagergemeinschaft für Bekleidung GmbH (ZLG), which produced and supplied textiles and clothing initially for German construction workers as well as for forced laborers, and later also for the Wehrmacht.

Reconstruction after 1945 
At the end of the war, most of the Hertie Group's stores were in the Soviet occupation zone while many of those in the west had been destroyed. Karg nevertheless decided to continue running the stores.

In 1949, Karg reached a settlement concerning the Nazi-era expropriation of the Jewish Tietz family.

In 1953, Karg established the Hertie Foundation with the entire department store assets of more than DM 1 billion as a contribution. After the fall of the Berlin Wall, the foundation participated in the then current trend of founding private universities with the Hertie School of Governance.

At Karg's death in 1972, the department store group consisted of 72 Hertie department stores and 29 branches of the Bilka department stores, with sales of DM 5.1 billion and around 60,000 employees. His son Hans-Georg Karg took over the management of the company in 1972. Karg junior sold Hertie to Karstadt in 1994.

Literature 

 Hans Otto Eglau: Georg Karg. Der Herr von Hertie. In: Ders.: Die Kasse muß stimmen. So hatten sie Erfolg im Handel. Econ, Düsseldorf 1972, ISBN 3-430-12325-9, S. 33–49.
 Friedrich W. Köhler: Zur Geschichte der Warenhäuser. Seenot und Untergang des Hertie-Konzerns. Haag + Herchen, Frankfurt am Main 1997, ISBN 3-86137-544-3.
 Simone Ladwig-Winters: Wertheim – ein Warenhausunternehmen und seine Eigentümer. Ein Beispiel der Entwicklung der Berliner Warenhäuser bis zur „Arisierung“. Lit-Verlag, Münster 1997, zu Tietz siehe S. 149–158 und 176–189, Inhaltsverzeichnis.

External links 

 Hans Otto Eglau:  (Internet Archive). In: Die Zeit, 27. November 1970, Nr. 48.
 
 Goebbels and the Nazi Attack on Jewish-owned Department Stores
 Holocaust Victim Assets Litigation Case No. CV96-4849

References 

German business executives
1972 deaths
1888 births